The 86th Street station was an express station on the demolished IRT Second Avenue Line in Manhattan, New York City. It had two levels. The lower level had two tracks and two side platforms, and was served by local trains. The upper level was built as a part of the Dual Contracts and had one track and two side platforms for express trains. The next stop to the north was 92nd Street for local trains and 125th Street for express trains. The next stop to the south was 80th Street for local trains and 57th Street for express trains. The station closed on June 11, 1940. The site is now served by the 86th Street station of the Second Avenue Subway.

References

External links
 

IRT Second Avenue Line stations
Railway stations closed in 1940
Former elevated and subway stations in Manhattan
1940 disestablishments in New York (state)